The Canon EF-M 11-22mm f/4-5.6 IS STM is an interchangeable wide angle lens for the Canon EOS M system of mirrorless cameras. It was announced by Canon Inc. on June 6, 2013. This lens was for a long time not available from Canon USA, but it has been since 2015.

References

http://www.dpreview.com/products/canon/lenses/canon_m_11-22_4-5p6/specifications
https://web.archive.org/web/20151005071415/http://www.canon.de/for_home/product_finder/cameras/ef_lenses/ef-m/ef-m_11-22mm_f4-5.6_is_stm/
https://web.archive.org/web/20150616021437/http://www.canon.de/images/Preisliste_Canon_Consumer_Produkte_08062015_tcm83-376784.pdf

External links

Canon EF-M-mount lenses
Camera lenses introduced in 2013